Triflusal is a platelet aggregation inhibitor that was discovered and developed in the Uriach Laboratories, and commercialised in Spain since 1981. Currently, it is available in 25 countries in Europe, Asia, Africa and America. It is a derivative of acetylsalicylic acid (ASA) in which a hydrogen atom on the benzene ring has been replaced by a trifluromethyl group. Trade names include Disgren, Grendis, Aflen and Triflux.

Triflusal has multiple mechanisms of action that contribute to the effect of the drug. It is a COX-1 inhibitor. It also inhibits the activation of nuclear factor k-B, which in turn regulates the expression of the mRNA of the vascular cell adhesion molecule-1 needed for platelet aggregation. Additionally, Triflusal preserves vascular prostacyclin which yields an anti-platelet effect. Triflusal also blocks phosphodiesterase, increasing cAMP concentration as well as can increase nitric oxide synthesis in neutrophils.

Mechanism of action
Triflusal is a selective platelet antiaggregant through;
 blocks cyclooxygenase, thereby inhibiting thromboxane A2, and thus preventing aggregation 
 preserves vascular prostacyclin, thus promoting anti-aggregant effect
inhibits activation of nuclear factor kB, which regulates the expression of the mRNA of vascular cell adhesion molecule-1 needed for platelet aggregation
 blocks phosphodiesterase thereby increasing cAMP concentration, thereby promoting anti-aggregant effect due to inhibition of calcium mobilization 
increases nitric oxide synthesis in neutrophils

Indication
Triflusal is indicated for;
 Prevention of cardiovascular events such as stroke
 Acute treatment of cerebral infarction, myocardial infarction
 Thromboprophylaxis due to atrial fibrillation

Prevention of stroke
In the 2008 guidelines for stroke management from the European Stroke Organization, triflusal was for the first time recommended as lone therapy, as an alternative to acetylsalicylic acid plus dipyridamole, or clopidogrel alone for secondary prevention of atherothrombotic stroke. This recommendation was based on the double-blind, randomised TACIP and TAPIRSS trials, which found triflusal to be equally as effective as Aspirin in preventing post-stroke vascular events, while having a more favourable safety profile.

Pharmacokinetics
It is absorbed in the small intestine and its bio-availability ranges from 83% to 100%. The active metabolite of Triflusal is 2-hydroxy-4-trifluoromethyl-benzoic acid, which is when Triflusal gets metabolized by an esterase.

References 

Antiplatelet drugs
Acetylsalicylic acids
Trifluoromethyl compounds